The Covin is a kit car replica of the Porsche 911 Turbo created by Tim Cook and Nick Vincent in the early 1980s. The name Covin came from CO (Cook) and VIN (Vincent) to produce COVIN Performance Mouldings. 
Early models of the Covin were based on a shortened Beetle floorplan/running gear but later used its own Covin chassis and VW Type 3 running gear.

The company was sold in the 1990s to DAX and later moved to new owners GPC and was relocated to County Galway in  Ireland where up to now the Covin has not been produced again. 
The Covin came in three body styles all based on the Turbo model.  Flatnose and Coupe both were also available in a convertible version. There is also known to be only one narrow body Covin ever made. Covin produced a few 356 Speedster models.

The Covin Club
The Covin Owners Club is run by Darren Parker (club technical adviser) and club secretary Michael Dykes. As of 2015, the Covin forum has 378 members, and 24487 posts, covering 2762 topics.

External links 
 Covin website
 Covin Forum

Sports cars
Kit car manufacturers